Bad Aibling station is a railway station in the city of Bad Aibling, located in the Rosenheim district in Upper Bavaria, Germany.

History  
The station was erected in the 19th century for the Mangfall Valley Railway. Officially put in to service on October 31, 1857, the station is now operated by the Deutsche Bahn AG and used for heavy and regional trains.

In direct vicinity to the Bad Aibling station a second station served as a railway terminus for an electrified branch line to Bad Feilnbach that it now dismantled.

Accidents and incidents
On the route between Bad Aibling and Kolbermoor on May 28, 1945 military train full of soldiers collided head on with an empty train. The accident, which occurred in a forest about 2 kilometres eastbound of the Bad Aibling station, took five lives and caused 21 injured, some seriously. Contributory cause was the interruption of telephone and communication lines between Bad Aibling and Kolbermoor at the end of World War II.

On 9 February 2016 the Bad Aibling rail accident occurred only 700m from the location of the 1945 accident when two passenger trains were involved in a head-on collision near Bad Aibling. Several people were killed and many more were injured.

See also 
 Bad Aibling Station, a similarly named dismantled satellite tracking station operated by the Bundesnachrichtendienst and a former NSA facility.

References

External links
 Official web site

Railway stations in Bavaria
Buildings and structures in Rosenheim (district)